John Kohn (1925 – May 4, 2002) was an American writer and producer who also served as head of production for EMI (1979–1983).

Biography
Kohn was born to a Jewish family, the son of a New York rabbi. During World War II, he flew 36 missions as a tail gunner in the United States Army Air Forces. After his service, he graduated with a B.A. from UCLA.

Personal life
In 1953, he married Barbara Jaffe, the daughter of agent-producer Sam Jaffe; they had two children, director Peter Kohn (who is married and divorced from actress Amanda Pays) and Susan Kohn Levine. He died on March 4, 2002, of cancer at his home in Sherman Oaks, California.

Filmography

 Gruen Guild Theatre (1951) – writer
 Front Page Detective (1951) – writer
 Rebound (1952) – writer
 Campbell Summer Soundstage (1952) – writer
 Biff Baker, U.S.A (1952) – writer
 The Dennis Day Show (1954) – writer
 Father Knows Best (1955) – writer
 It's a Great Life (1955) – writer
 The Adventures of Hiram Holiday (1955) – writer
 The Ford Television Theatre (1957) – writer
 The Ann Sothern Show (1958–1959) – writer
 Bachelor Father (1959) – writer
 The Many Loves of Dobie Gillis (1960) – writer
 Reach for Glory (1962) – producer / writer
 Siege of the Saxons (1963) – writer
 The Collector (1965) – writer
 Caprice (1967) – writer
Fathom (1967) – producer
The Magus (1968) – producer
Figures in a Landscape (1970) – producer
The Strange Vengeance of Rosalie (1972) – producer
The Wrath of God (1972) – producer
Theatre of Blood (1973) – producer
Golden Girl (1979) – writer
Racing with the Moon (1984) – producer
Shanghai Surprise (1986) – producer

Awards

References

External links

1925 births
2002 deaths
Jewish American screenwriters
American film producers
Deaths from cancer in California
20th-century American screenwriters
Jaffe family
United States Army Air Forces personnel of World War II
United States Army Air Forces soldiers
20th-century American Jews
21st-century American Jews